A shooter, or shot, is a small serving of spirits or a mixed drink (usually about ), typically consumed quickly, often in a single gulp. It is common to serve a shooter as a "side" to a larger drink.

Shooters can be shaken, stirred, blended, layered, or simply poured. Shot glasses or sherry glasses are the usual drinkware in which shooters are served. They are most commonly served at bars, and some bartenders have their own "signature" shooter.

The ingredients of shooters vary from bartender to bartender and from region to region. Two shooters can have the same name but different ingredients, resulting in two very different tastes.

List of drink shots

Shooters with beer

 Mixed shooters
 Boilermaker or Depth Charge: a beer mix
 Snakebite: variations and alternate names: Snakebite and black, Diesel, Snakey B, Purple nasty, Purple, Black, Deadly snakebite, Hard snakebite, and Super snakebite.
 U-Boot: a beer mix
 Irish car bomb: a mix of Irish whisky and Irish cream or other ingredients in a pint-glass of Irish stout.

Shooters with non-alcoholic bases
 Mixed shooters
 Jägerbomb, or Bulldozer, or Blaster: a shot glass with Jägermeister dropped into a glass of half a can of Red Bull. In German speaking countries this drink is called Fliegender Hirsch (Flying Deer).  It can also be made by filling a shot glass with half Jägermeister and half Red Bull or by placing a  shot glass full of Jägermeister at the bottom of a glass and filling with Red Bull.
 Geritol: a shot glass with Grand Marnier dropped into a glass of half a can of Red Bull. It can also be made by filling a shot glass with half Grand Marnier and half Red Bull or by placing a  shot glass full of Grand Marnier at the bottom of a glass and filling with Red Bull.

Shooters with Irish cream

 Layered shooters
 B-52 (and related B-50 series cocktails).
 Baby Guinness: Two thirds to three quarters of a shot glass filled with coffee liqueur. Irish Cream poured gently, over the back of a spoon, onto the top of the liqueur. The finished result should give the impression, if done correctly, of a tiny pint of Stout.
 Cocksucking Cowboy (also called the Brokeback Shooter): two parts cold butterscotch schnapps with one part of Irish Cream, making it 32% ABV. The Irish Cream is poured off the back of a bar spoon so it "floats" on top of the schnapps in a shot glass.
Irish Flag: Crème de menthe (green), Irish cream and Grand Marnier in a shot glass. The end result is a very small Irish flag.

Shooters with rum

 Layered shooters
 Flaming B-52 (also B-51, B-52 with Bomb-bay Doors, B-53, B-54, B-55, and B-57)

Shooters with tequila

 Mixed shooters
 Mexican Prairie Fire: see Prairie Fire.
 Tequila Slammer
 Tequesso: A shot of Tequila (often Patrón) chased by a shot of coffee
Layered shooters

Shooters with vodka

 Mixed shooters
 Lemon Drop: A chilled shot of lemon-flavored vodka served with a lemon wedge covered in sugar.  One takes the shot, then bites the lemon.  Vodka with lemon juice can be substituted if no lemon-flavored vodka is available.
 Ruffe (see Boilermaker).
 Kamikaze: vodka, triple sec, and Lime juice, mixed in equal parts. It is also served traditionally.
 Snakebite with venom, poison snakebite, or turbo diesel (see Snakebite). [< that's a beer cocktail, not a shooter]
 U-Boot

Shooters with whiskey/whisky or bourbon

 Mixed shooters
 Canadian Prairie Fire (see Prairie Fire)
 Prairie Fire
 Pickleback: A shot of whiskey (often Jameson) chased by a shot of pickle brine.
 Washington Apple: Equal parts Canadian whisky, sour apple liqueur, and cranberry juice

Shooters with wine, sparkling wine, or port

 Mixed shooters
 Slammer Royale (see Tequila Slammer)

Cocktails with less common spirits

 Mixed shooters
 Bazooka Joe: equal parts Irish Cream, Blue Curaçao and Banana liqueur (Pisang Ambon)
 Golden Elk: Jägermeister and Goldschläger
 Sake bomb

 Layered shooters
 Pousse Cafe

See also

 Bartender
 Bomb shot
 Cocktail
 Drinking culture
 Flair bartending
 List of cocktails

References

External links

 gulpology.com list of Classic Cocktail Shooter Recipes
 About.com list of shooter recipes 

 
 Mixed drink shooters and drink shots
Lists of cocktails
 Mixed drink shooters and drink shots